Sir Leszek Krzysztof Borysiewicz  (born 13 April 1951) is a British professor, immunologist and scientific administrator. He served as the 345th Vice-Chancellor of the University of Cambridge, his term of office (a maximum of seven years) started on 1 October 2010 and ended on 1 October 2017. Borysiewicz also served as chief executive of the Medical Research Council of the UK from 2007-2010 and has held the role of chairman at Cancer Research UK since 2016.

Education and early life
Leszek Krzysztof Borysiewicz was born in Cardiff, Wales, United Kingdom, to Jan and Zofia (née Wołoszyn) Borysiewicz, ethnic Polish World War II-era refugees (from what is present-day Belarus) who came to Great Britain with the Anders' Army. He still speaks fluent Polish. After attending Cardiff High School, Borysiewicz studied at Welsh National School of Medicine of Cardiff University, where he obtained a BSc in anatomy 1972, followed by an MB BCh medical degree in 1975. He received a PhD degree from University of London (Imperial College London) in 1986 for his thesis on Cell mediated immunity to human cytomegalovirus infection (cytotoxic T cell and natural killer cell mediated lysis of human cytomegalovirus infected cells) supervised by J.G.P. Sissons and Keith Peters.

Career and research
Borysiewicz pursued a career in academic medicine at the University of Cambridge, where he was a fellow of Wolfson College, and then as a consultant at Hammersmith Hospital. He headed the Department of Medicine at the University of Wales before joining Imperial College London, where he was promoted to Deputy Rector responsible "for the overall academic and scientific direction of the College," In September 2007, it was reported he would succeed Colin Blakemore as the 9th head of the Medical Research Council, a national organisation that supports medical science with an annual budget of around £500 million.

Borysiewicz was appointed as chairman of Cancer Research UK in November 2016. Cancer Research UK is one of the world's largest fundraising charities and is governed by a council of trustees, led by Borysiewicz. The council's role is to set the charity's strategic direction, uphold its value and governance, and guide, advise and support the chief executive.

Borysiewicz previously chaired the European Research Council Identification Committee (2014-2020); Scientific Advisory Board, Department for International Development, UK Government (2010-2016); and Joint MRC/UK Stem Cell Foundation Scientific Advisory Board (2005-2007).

He currently holds several other roles, including as a member of the UK Health Honours Committee and Wales Science and Innovation Council. 

Borysiewicz's research focuses on viral immunology, infectious disease, and viral-induced cancer. His work in vaccines included Europe's first trial of a vaccine for human papillomavirus to treat cervical cancer, research conducted at Cardiff University. He has co-authored and co-edited a number of books on these subjects, including Vaccinations.

Awards and honours
Borysiewicz was knighted by Queen Elizabeth II in the 2001 New Year Honours List for services to Medical Research and Education.

In 2002 he was awarded the Moxon Trust Medal of the Royal College of Physicians. He was also a Governor of the Wellcome Trust, a founding fellow of the Academy of Medical Sciences and co-chair of the MRC's advisory group on stem cell research. He was awarded an honorary doctorate of medicine in 2010 at the University of Sheffield. Borysiewicz is also a Founding Fellow of the Learned Society of Wales and Fellow of the Royal Society. 

In October 2018 he was awarded with the Grand Cross of the Order of Merit of the Republic of Poland, the highest-ranked Polish order of merit awarded to foreigners or Poles resident abroad for their services to Poland. He collected it during a ceremony at the Polish Embassy in London in late April 2019.

References

1951 births
Living people
Medical doctors from Cardiff
Welsh people of Polish descent
Alumni of Cardiff University
Alumni of the University of London
Alumni of Imperial College London
British immunologists
Academics of Imperial College London
Deputy Lieutenants of Cambridgeshire
Fellows of the Royal College of Physicians
Fellows of the Academy of Medical Sciences (United Kingdom)
Fellows of the Learned Society of Wales
Vice-Chancellors of the University of Cambridge
Fellows of the Royal Society
Fellows of Wolfson College, Cambridge
Knights Bachelor